Events from the year 1990 in Scotland.

Incumbents 

 Secretary of State for Scotland and Keeper of the Great Seal – Malcolm Rifkind until 28 November; then Ian Lang

Law officers 
 Lord Advocate – Lord Fraser of Carmyllie
 Solicitor General for Scotland – Alan Rodger

Judiciary 
 Lord President of the Court of Session and Lord Justice General – Lord Hope
 Lord Justice Clerk – Lord Ross
 Chairman of the Scottish Land Court – Lord Elliott

Events 
 17 March – Rugby union: Scotland beat England 13–7 at Murrayfield to win the Calcutta Cup. The win also clinches the 1990 Five Nations Championship, Grand Slam and Triple Crown for Scotland.
 24 April – Gruinard Island declared to be decontaminated of anthrax.
 29 April – Stephen Hendry, 21, wins the 1990 World Snooker Championship and becomes the youngest ever world snooker champion.
 3 May – 1990 Scottish regional elections held.
 12 May – Aberdeen beat Celtic 9–8 on penalties to win the Scottish Cup.
 13 July – The Term and Quarter Days (Scotland) Act 1990 receives Royal Assent.
 August – Privatisation of the Scottish Bus Group begins with sale of Lowland Scottish in a management-employee buy-out.
 22 September – Alex Salmond wins the Scottish National Party leadership election, succeeding Gordon Wilson
 27 September – The first episode of the sitcom Rab C. Nesbitt starring Gregor Fisher in the title role, is broadcast on BBC Two. The programme would run until 1999.
 29 November – Labour win by-elections in Paisley South and Paisley North, retaining both seats despite swings to the SNP of 11.7% and 14% respectively.

Arts and literature 
 22 August – James MacMillan's symphonic piece The Confession of Isobel Gowdie premieres at The Proms in London.
 13 September – Iain M. Banks' science fiction novel Use of Weapons is published.
 5 October – Glasgow Royal Concert Hall opens in Sauchiehall Street.
 11 October–15 November – BBC Scotland broadcasts the television comedy-drama series Your Cheatin' Heart written by John Byrne and starring Tilda Swinton and John Gordon Sinclair.
 Soft rock band Travis forms in Glasgow.

Births 
 24 March – Libby Clegg, athlete
 10 April – Stacey McDougall, lawn bowler
 22 April – Eve Muirhead, curler
 29 June – Kim Little, footballer
 2 July – Morag McLellan, field hockey player
 11 July – Lynsey Sharp, middle-distance runner
 13 August – Elise Christie, short-track speed skater
 25 November – Eilish McColgan, middle-distance runner

Deaths 
 6 January – Ian Charleson, actor (born 1949)
 8 January – Jenny Gilbertson, documentary filmmaker (born 1902)
 14 January – Gordon Jackson, actor (born 1923)
 12 August – Roy Williamson, folk musician (born 1936)
 4 November – David Stirling, army officer, founder of the Special Air Service (born 1915)
 Stephens Orr, society photographer

See also 
 1990 in Northern Ireland

References 

 
Scotland
Years of the 20th century in Scotland
1990s in Scotland